Karl Louis Brillant Toko Ekambi (born 14 September 1992) is a professional footballer who plays as a forward for Ligue 1 club Rennes, on loan from Lyon, and the Cameroon national team.

Toko Ekambi began his career with Paris FC in the Championnat National and Sochaux in Ligue 2 before joining Angers in Ligue 1. After 18 months at Villarreal in Spain's La Liga, he returned to France's top flight with Lyon.

Born in France, Toko Ekambi made his international debut for Cameroon in 2015. He represented the nation at the Africa Cup of Nations in 2017, 2019 and 2021, winning the 2017 tournament. He also played at the 2022 FIFA World Cup.

Club career

Sochaux
Born in Paris, Toko Ekambi began his career at Paris FC in the third-tier Championnat National. In June 2014, having been third-top scorer with 13 goals, he transferred to  Sochaux. He made his Ligue 2 debut on the opening day of the 2014–15 season against Orléans, as a 57th-minute substitute for Thomas Guerbert in a 1–0 home loss. He ended his first season as joint-fourth top scorer with 14 goals.

Angers
In June 2016, Toko Ekambi joined Angers for €1 million, on a four-year deal. He scored seven times in his first Ligue 1 season, including two in a 3–0 home win over Bastia on 26 February.

In August 2017, Brighton & Hove Albion, newly promoted to the Premier League, reportedly made a bid for him, offering €8 million plus €1 million in possible bonuses to Angers. He began that season in good form, scoring nine goals in 18 Ligue 1 appearances in the first half of the season, attracting interest from England for his services in the January transfer window. 

In January 2018 Brighton were again reported to have made a bid for him, which was rejected by Angers. On 24 February, Toko Ekambi scored two-second-half goals, including the winner in the 89th minute, to help Angers move out of the relegation zone in a 2–1 away win over fellow strugglers Lille. He finished the 2017–18 Ligue 1 season with 17 goals, ninth in the league's top scorers. He won the Prix Marc-Vivien Foé for best African in the league. He was the first Cameroonian to win the award named after Marc-Vivien Foé, who died playing for the country in 2003.

On 25 April 2017, late substitute Toko Ekambi scored in a 2–0 home win over Guingamp in the Coupe de France semi-final. In Angers' first final since 1957 on 27 May, he played the entirety of a 1–0 loss to Paris Saint-Germain (PSG).

Villarreal

In June 2018, Toko Ekambi signed with Villarreal in Spain's La Liga, for an estimated €20 million. He was signed to replace Cédric Bakambu, who had left for the Chinese Super League in January. He scored ten goals in his first league season, including two in a 3–1 home win over Rayo Vallecano on 17 March.

With five goals each, Toko Ekambi and Getafe's Ángel were top scorers of the 2018–19 Copa del Rey. This included four in an 8–0 (11–3 aggregate) home win over Almería in the last 32 second leg, followed by a goal in the next stage against Espanyol, who eliminated his team.

Toko Ekambi was the La Liga Player of the Month for October 2019, with three goals including two in a 4–1 win over Alavés on 25 October.

Lyon 
On 20 January 2020, Toko Ekambi went back to Ligue 1, on loan to Lyon for the remainder of the season. On 2 June, he moved on a permanent transfer with a four-year contract, for a fee of €11.5 million. He played in the 2020 Coupe de la Ligue Final on 31 July, the last game in the competition's history. On as an 80th-minute substitute for Memphis Depay, he scored in the penalty shootout after a goalless draw, but his team lost to PSG.

With 14 goals in 2020–21, Toko Ekambi was once again joint ninth top scorer in Ligue 1. The following season, he finished joint tenth with 12 goals.

Loan to Rennes 
On 26 January 2023, fellow Ligue 1 club Rennes announced the signing of Toko Ekambi on loan from Lyon for the remainder of the season.

International career

Toko Ekambi made his debut for Cameroon on 6 June 2015 in a 3–2 friendly win over Burkina Faso in Colombes, France, as a 66th-minute substitute for Justin Mengolo. He scored his first goal on 3 September the following year in a 2–0 home win over the Gambia in 2017 Africa Cup of Nations qualification. Manager Hugo Broos called him up for the final tournament in Gabon, which the team won.

On 28 March 2017, Toko Ekambi scored and was sent off in a 2–1 friendly loss to Guinea in Brussels. In June, Broos selected him for the 2017 Confederations Cup in Russia. He also went to the 2019 Africa Cup of Nations in Egypt.

At the 2021 Africa Cup of Nations on home soil at the start of the following year, Toko Ekambi scored twice in a 4–1 group win over Ethiopia, and the opening goal of a 2–1 win against Comoros in the last 16. On 29 January, he scored both goals against the Gambia in the quarter-finals. On 29 March 2022, he scored a goal in the fourth minute of time added on at the end of extra time against Algeria to send Cameroon to the 2022 FIFA World Cup. At the finals in Qatar, he started the first two games and was a substitute in the 1–0 win over Brazil, as the team exited in the group stage.

Career statistics

Club

International

Scores and results list Cameroon's goal tally first, score column indicates score after each Toko Ekambi goal

Honours
Lyon
 Coupe de la Ligue runner-up: 2019–20

Cameroon
 Africa Cup of Nations: 2017; third place: 2021

Individual
 Ligue 2 Team of the Year: 2014–15
 Prix Marc-Vivien Foé: 2018
La Liga Player of the Month: October 2019

References

External links

 
 

1992 births
Living people
Footballers from Paris
French footballers
Cameroonian footballers
Association football forwards
Paris FC players
FC Sochaux-Montbéliard players
Angers SCO players
Villarreal CF players
Olympique Lyonnais players
Stade Rennais F.C. players
Championnat National players
Championnat National 3 players
Ligue 2 players
Ligue 1 players
La Liga players
Cameroon international footballers
2017 Africa Cup of Nations players
2017 FIFA Confederations Cup players
2019 Africa Cup of Nations players
2021 Africa Cup of Nations players
2022 FIFA World Cup players
Africa Cup of Nations-winning players
French expatriate footballers
Cameroonian expatriate footballers
Expatriate footballers in Spain
Cameroonian expatriate sportspeople in Spain
French sportspeople of Cameroonian descent
Citizens of Cameroon through descent